A329 may refer to:
 A329 road in Great Britain
 A329(M) motorway in Great Britain